The Cleveland Show is an American animated sitcom created by Seth MacFarlane, Richard Appel, and Mike Henry for the Fox Broadcasting Company. A spin-off of Family Guy, and the second television series in the franchise, the series centers on Cleveland Brown, his new wife Donna Tubbs-Brown, and their children Cleveland Brown Jr., Roberta Tubbs, and Rallo Tubbs. Similar to Family Guy, it exhibited much of its humor in the form of cutaway gags that often lampoon American culture, though it uses significantly fewer than Family Guy. Fox cancelled the series after 4 seasons. The animation was produced by Fox Television Animation.

The series was conceived by MacFarlane in 2007 after developing Family Guy and American Dad! for the Fox network. MacFarlane centered the show on Family Guy character Cleveland Brown and created new characters for Cleveland's family members. One preexisting character, Cleveland's son Cleveland Jr. (Junior), was redesigned as an obese, soft-spoken teen, as opposed to his depiction as a younger, hyperactive child with average body weight on Family Guy.

The series premiered on September 27, 2009, and ended on May 19, 2013, with a total of 88 episodes over the course of 4 seasons. The Cleveland Show was nominated for one Annie Award, one Primetime Emmy Award, and two Teen Choice Awards, but received mixed reviews from media critics. Nearly a year after the series' cancelation, Cleveland returned to Family Guy, accompanied by the rest of the Brown-Tubbs family, in the season 12 episode "He's Bla-ack!" during which his show was mercilessly mocked by his friends.

Production

Development 
Seth MacFarlane initially conceived The Cleveland Show in 2007 while working on his other two animated series, Family Guy and American Dad!.

The Cleveland Show first appeared on the development slate at Fox in early 2008, under no official name for the pilot, after a report that Fox had purchased the series from creators. The pilot was named The Cleveland Show in May 2008, when it appeared on the primetime slate for the 2008–09 television season, although it wasn't officially on the network schedule. Shortly after a report that King of the Hill just ended, leaving air time for The Cleveland Show, the show was picked up for a full season after an additional nine episodes of the show were ordered. In May 2009, The Cleveland Show appeared on the primetime slate for the 2009–10 television season, for airing on Sunday nights at 8:30 pm On June 15, 2009, it was announced that The Cleveland Show would premiere on September 27, 2009.

MacFarlane and Henry pitched a 22-minute to Fox which aired on September 27, 2009 but had been leaked on the internet in June 2009. Even before the pilot episode premiered, the show had already been renewed for a 22-episode second season. After the first season of the show aired, it was given the green light to start production. On June 10, 2010, less than three weeks into the first season's summer hiatus, it was announced that Fox was ordering a third season. A fourth season was announced on May 9, 2011, just a few days before the second season concluded.

Executive producers 
Seth MacFarlane, Mike Henry and Richard Appel have served as executive producers on the series since the first season.

Voice cast 
Mike Henry voices two of the show's main characters: Cleveland Brown and Rallo Tubbs. The voice of Cleveland was developed originally for Family Guy by Henry after being influenced by one of his best friends who had a very distinct regional accent. For the voice of Rallo, Henry stated that he created the voice over twenty years before; he had used it while making prank phone calls.

Sanaa Lathan voices Donna Tubbs, the wife of Cleveland, stepmother of Cleveland Brown Jr., and mother of Roberta and Rallo Tubbs. In developing the character, Lathan said that the producers "wanted her to be educated, but to have some edge." Prior to voicing Donna, Lathan had only one other voice credit in a relatively low-budget film entitled The Golden Blaze. In addition to the show, she also primarily worked as an actress in such films as Alien vs. Predator, Love & Basketball and The Family That Preys.

Reagan Gomez-Preston plays Roberta Tubbs, the stepdaughter of Cleveland. Gomez has stated that she uses her own voice to portray Roberta and that she herself gets mistaken for a fifteen-year-old over the phone "all the time." Before Gomez was cast as Roberta, Nia Long (who co-starred with Lathan in The Best Man franchise) provided the character's voice during the first thirteen episodes. According to Long, she was replaced because producers decided they wanted an actress with a younger-sounding voice, given that the character is a teenager.

Kevin Michael Richardson, a recurring guest voice on Family Guy and American Dad!, portrays Cleveland, Jr., as well as Cleveland's next-door neighbor Lester Krinklesac. In portraying Cleveland, Jr., Richardson drew inspiration from a character named Patrick that he had played on the NBC drama series ER who was mentally impaired and wore a football helmet. For Lester, Richardson stated in an interview that, being African American, he had "run into a few rednecks in [his] time", and decided to simply perform a stereotypical redneck impression for the voice of Lester.

Jason Sudeikis plays Holt Richter, one of Cleveland's drinking buddies with short stature, and Terry Kimple, one of Cleveland's longtime friends who now works with him at Waterman Cable. Sudeikis originally began as a recurring cast member, but starting with the episode "Harder, Better, Faster, Browner", he was promoted to a series regular.

Seth MacFarlane played Tim the Bear up until season 3 episode 10, which MacFarlane admits is a "Steve Martin impression [...] a Wild and Crazy Guy impression". Jess Harnell voices the character for the rest of the series from the next episode onward, as MacFarlane grew tired of voicing the character.

Other voices include that of Arianna Huffington as Tim's wife Arianna the Bear, Nat Faxon as Tim and Arianna's son Raymond the Bear, Jamie Kennedy as Roberta's boyfriend Gabriel Friedman, a.k.a. " Federline Jones", Will Forte as Principal Wally, Frances Callier as Evelyn "Cookie" Brown, Craig Robinson as LeVar "Freight Train" Brown and David Lynch as Gus the bartender.

Characters 

Cleveland's newly introduced family includes his new wife, Donna Tubbs-Brown (voiced by Sanaa Lathan); Donna's daughter Roberta (originally voiced by Nia Long, but later voiced by Reagan Gomez-Preston); and Donna's son Rallo (voiced by Mike Henry). Cleveland, Jr. underwent a complete redesign for the show, becoming sensitive and soft-spoken.

Episodes

Crossovers with other animated sitcoms
The Cleveland Show characters have appeared on other animated sitcoms and vice versa. The Cleveland Show crossovers have all involved two other animated programs. Both the other two animated programs were also created by Seth MacFarlane—Family Guy and American Dad!. There are also many brief cameos of characters from three other Fox animated shows, The Simpsons, Futurama, and King of the Hill.

Syndication and streaming  
In July 2010, the Turner Broadcasting System picked up syndication rights, for their networks TBS and later, Adult Swim. The series first aired on Adult Swim in the United States on September 29, 2012. On July 14, 2018, Viacom later picked up the rights to the series and the series left Adult Swim and TBS on September 9, 2018. The series began airing on Comedy Central in the United States on October 8, 2018 until April 29, 2022 with ViacomCBS sister networks BET and VH1 airing the series starting on August 31, 2020 and September 14, 2020, respectively. The series is available for streaming on Hulu.

The series began airing on FXX on September 20, 2021.

Internationally, The Cleveland Show is available to stream on Star on Disney+.

Cancellation 
On April 17, 2013, Fox dismissed increasing rumors that The Cleveland Show had been canceled, reporting rather that renewal of the series was undetermined as of that time. However, on May 13, 2013, in the New York Daily News, Fox Chairman of Entertainment Kevin Reilly confirmed the show's cancellation. Following the series cancellation, it was confirmed that Cleveland would be moving back to Quahog with the rest of the Brown-Tubbs family to rejoin the Family Guy cast.

Reception

Critical reception 
The Cleveland Show initially received mixed reviews from critics. Review aggregator Metacritic gave the show a score of 57 out of 100. Tom Shales of The Washington Post spoke very negatively about both the show and MacFarlane himself, describing him as "no better than the dirty old man hanging around playgrounds with naughty pictures or risque jokes as lures". Roberto Bianco of USA Today wrote a similarly negative review, suggesting that the easiest fix for its problem was "cancellation". John McWhorter of The New Republic called it "a patronizing mess" and "basically Family Guy in blackface". He added: "What isn't black in it is so shamelessly ripped off from Family Guy that it's hard to believe it's the product of creators who are usually so studiously 'post-' obvious stunts of the sort."

Matt Rouse of TV Guide wrote, "The lamest, most unnecessary spin-off since Private Practice, Cleveland rests on the shoulders of the hopelessly bland title character". However, Rob Owen of the Pittsburgh Post-Gazette was more positive about the program, writing that although The Cleveland Show was "just as rude-crude" as Family Guy, it also had "more warmth" due to Cleveland being a more likable character than Peter Griffin. Owen also praised the character of Tim the Bear, stating that "Tim is by far the most amusing creation." Jonathan Storm of the Philadelphia Inquirer, also spoke positively, stating that "[Cleveland] sounds funnier, and he shows way more personality than we've seen in his many years on Family Guy. [...] While it seems to be missing some of the over-the-top offensive bites we're used to on Family Guy, and Cleveland's new drinking buddies aren't quite as amusing as the Quagmire, Joe, and Peter combination - there's a lot to like here."

Awards and nominations

Home media
Internationally The Cleveland Show is available to stream on Star on Disney + with all four seasons.

References

External links 

 

 
2009 American television series debuts
2013 American television series endings
2000s American adult animated television series
2000s American animated comedy television series
2000s American black cartoons
2000s American black sitcoms
2000s American satirical television series
2010s American adult animated television series
2010s American animated comedy television series
2010s American black cartoons
2010s American black sitcoms
2010s American satirical television series
American adult animated adventure television series
American adult animated comedy television series
American animated sitcoms
Animated satirical television series
American adult animated television spin-offs
Animated television series about dysfunctional families
English-language television shows
Family Guy
Fox Broadcasting Company original programming
Television series created by Seth MacFarlane
Television series by 20th Century Fox Television
Television series by Fuzzy Door Productions
Television series by Fox Television Animation
Television shows set in Virginia
Crossover animated television series